Phosphatidylcholines (PC) are a class of phospholipids that incorporate choline as a headgroup.
They are a major component of biological membranes and can be easily obtained from a variety of readily available sources, such as egg yolk or soybeans, from which they are mechanically or chemically extracted using hexane.  They are also a member of the lecithin group of yellow-brownish fatty substances occurring in animal and plant tissues. Dipalmitoyl phosphatidylcholine (a.k.a. lecithin) is a major component of pulmonary surfactant and is often used in the L/S ratio to calculate fetal lung maturity. While phosphatidylcholines are found in all plant and animal cells, they are absent in the membranes of most bacteria, including Escherichia coli. Purified phosphatidylcholine is produced commercially.

The name lecithin was derived from Greek λέκιθος, lekithos 'egg yolk' by Theodore Nicolas Gobley, a French chemist and pharmacist of the mid-19th century, who applied it to the egg yolk phosphatidylcholine that he identified in 1847. Gobley eventually completely described his lecithin from chemical structural point of view, in 1874. Phosphatidylcholines are such a major component of lecithin that in some contexts the terms are sometimes used as synonyms. However, lecithin extracts consist of a mixture of phosphatidylcholine and other compounds. It is also used along with sodium taurocholate for simulating fed- and fasted-state biorelevant media in dissolution studies of highly lipophilic drugs.

Phosphatidylcholine is a major constituent of cell membranes and pulmonary surfactant, and is more commonly found in the exoplasmic or outer leaflet of a cell membrane.  It is thought to be transported between membranes within the cell by phosphatidylcholine transfer protein (PCTP).

Phosphatidylcholine also plays a role in membrane-mediated cell signaling and PCTP activation of other enzymes.

Structure and physical properties

This phospholipid is composed of a choline head group and glycerophosphoric acid, with a variety of fatty acids. Usually, one is a saturated fatty acid (in the given figure, this is palmitic acid (hexadecanoic acid, H3C-(CH2)14-COOH); margaric acid (heptadecanoic acid, H3C-(CH2)15-COOH), identified by Gobley in egg yolk, also belong to that class); and the other is an unsaturated fatty acid (here oleic acid, or 9Z-octadecenoic acid, as in Gobley's original egg yolk lecithin). However, there are also examples of disaturated species. Animal lung phosphatidylcholine, for example, contains a high proportion of dipalmitoylphosphatidylcholine.

Phospholipase D catalyzes the hydrolysis of phosphatidylcholine to form phosphatidic acid (PA), releasing the soluble choline headgroup into the cytosol.

Possible health benefits

Senescence
A 2009 systematic review of clinical trials in humans found that there was not enough evidence to support supplementation of lecithin or phosphatidylcholine in dementia. The study found that a moderate benefit could not be ruled out until further large scale studies were performed.

Lipolysis
Though phosphatidylcholine has been studied as an alternative to liposuction, there are no peer-reviewed studies that have shown it to have comparable effects. Injection of phosphatidylcholine in lipomas has been studied, though results have been mixed.

Ulcerative colitis
Treatment of ulcerative colitis with oral intake of phosphatidylcholine has been shown to result in decreased disease activity.

Possible health risks
A 2011 report linked the microbial catabolites of phosphatidylcholine with increased atherosclerosis in mice through the production of choline, trimethylamine oxide, and betaine.

Biosynthesis 
Although multiple pathways exist for the biosynthesis of phosphatidylcholine, the predominant route in eukaryotes involves condensation between diacylglycerol (DAG) and cytidine 5'-diphosphocholine (CDP-choline or citicoline).  The conversion is mediated by the enzyme diacylglycerol cholinephosphotransferase. Another pathway, mainly operative in the liver involves methylation of phosphatidylethanolamine with S-adenosyl methionine (SAM) being the methyl group donor.

Additional images

See also 
 CDP choline
 Lysophosphatidylcholine
 Phosphatidylserine
 Saturated fatty acid
 Unsaturated fatty acid

References

External links 
 
 

Phosphatidylcholines
Cholinergics
Phospholipids

de:Phosphatidylcholin